Martin Müller may refer to:

 Martin Müller (cyclist) (born 1974), German cyclist
 Martin Müller (footballer, born 1957), Swiss football player
 Martin Müller (footballer, born 1970), Czech football player

 Martin Muller (rugby union) (born 1988), South African rugby union player
 Martin Müller (wrestler) (born 1966), Swiss Olympic wrestler